Félix Bonnat (23 April 1921 – 16 May 2013) was a French bobsledder who competed in the late 1940s. He finished 13th in the four-man event at the 1948 Winter Olympics in St. Moritz. During World War II, he was imprisoned in both the Natzweiler-Struthof and Dachau concentration camps.

References

External links
1948 bobsleigh four-man results

1921 births
2013 deaths
French male bobsledders
Olympic bobsledders of France
Bobsledders at the 1948 Winter Olympics
People from Voiron
Sportspeople from Isère